Igor Lipalit (born January 14, 1940) is a Romanian sprint canoer who competed in the early 1960s. He won a bronze medal in the C-2 10000 m event at the 1963 ICF Canoe Sprint World Championships in Jajce.

Competing in two Summer Olympics, Lipalit earned his best finish of fourth in the C-2 1000 m event at Rome in 1960.

References

Sports-reference.com profile

1940 births
Canoeists at the 1960 Summer Olympics
Canoeists at the 1964 Summer Olympics
Living people
Olympic canoeists of Romania
Romanian male canoeists
Romanian people of Russian descent
ICF Canoe Sprint World Championships medalists in Canadian